Çetinkaya Türk Spor Kulübü which is also known as "Kırmızı Şimşekler" (Red Thunders) is a Turkish Cypriot sports club based in North Nicosia. They are the most decorated team in Northern Cyprus .

History

Lefkoşa Türk Spor Kulübü  was founded in 1930, and was one of the founding members of the Cypriot First Division in 1934, the sole Turkish Cypriot team in the league (with 7 Greek Cypriot teams: AEL Limassol, Trust, Olympiakos Nicosia, Aris Limassol, APOEL, Anorthosis Famagusta, and EPA Larnaca). The club merged with Çetinkaya Türk Esnaf Ocağı (founded in 1943) on 1949, changing its name to Çetinkaya Türk Spor Birliği.

The club went on to become the first team to keep the Cyprus FA Shield permanently after winning it thrice on 1951, 1952, and 1954. After the formation of Cyprus Turkish Football Federation on 1955, the club became a founding member of the Birinci Lig. Çetinkaya Türk remains the only club to have won both Cypriot leagues, main Cup competition, and Super Cup to date.

Colours
The club colours are yellow and red.

Team honours

Under Cyprus Football Association (until 1954)
Cypriot First Division: (1)
 1950–51
Cypriot Cup: (2)
 1951–52, 1953–54
Runners-up (1): 1952–53
Pakkos Shield: (3)
 1951, 1952, 1954

Under Cyprus Turkish Football Association (since 1954)
Birinci Lig: (13)
 1957–58, 1959–60, 1960–61, 1961–62, 1969–70, 1996–97, 1997–98, 1999–00, 2001–02, 2003–04, 2004–05, 2006–07, 2011–12
Kıbrıs Kupası and Federasyon Kupası: (17)
 1956, 1957, 1958, 1959, 1960, 1963, 1969, 1970, 1976, 1991, 1992, 1993, 1996, 1999, 2001, 2006, 2011
Runners-up (1): 1998
Cumhurbaşkanlığı Kupası: (7)
 1991, 1992, 1993, 1996, 1998, 2001, 2006, 2011, 2012
Runners-up (3): 1997, 1999, 2000
Dr. Fazıl Küçük Kupası: (5)
 1992, 1993, 1996, 1998, 2000
Runners-up (3): 1991, 1999, 2001
Başbakanlık Kupası: (0)

Runners-up (2): 1990, 1998

Footnotes

Extra reading

 
Association football clubs established in 1930
Football clubs in Nicosia
Football clubs in Northern Cyprus
1930 establishments in Cyprus